Delonix tomentosa is a species of flowering plant in the family Fabaceae. It is endemic to Madagascar, where it is known only from the type specimen collected over 100 years ago. It has not been seen since and may be extinct.

References

tomentosa
Endemic flora of Madagascar
Endangered plants
Taxonomy articles created by Polbot
Flora of the Madagascar dry deciduous forests